Waingels College is an 11–18 mixed, secondary school and sixth form with academy status in Woodley, Berkshire, England.

Notable alumni 
 James Henry, professional footballer
 Irwin Sparkes, musician (member of The Hoosiers)
 David Warburton, composer, businessman, and politician

References

External links 
 

Secondary schools in the Borough of Wokingham
Academies in the Borough of Wokingham